Josepha is a given name. Notable people with the name include:

 Josepha Abiertas (1894–1929), Filipino lawyer and feminist, first woman to obtain a degree from the Philippine Law School
 Josepha Barbara Auernhammer (1758–1820), Austrian pianist and composer
 Josepha Conti (1825–1881), Bavarian servant and beauty
 Josepha Williams Douglas (1860–1938), also commonly known as Josepha Williams, American physician
 Josepha Duschek (1754–1824), Czech soprano
 Josepha von Heydeck (1748–1771), mistress of Charles Theodore, Elector of Bavaria
 Josepha Petrick Kemarre (born ca. 1945 or ca. 1953), Indigenous Australian artist
 Josepha Madigan, Irish politician and solicitor
 Josepha Sherman, American author, winner of the Compton Crook Award for the novel The Shining Falcon
 Josepha Weber (1758–1819), German soprano, sister-in-law of Mozart
 Josepha Newcomb Whitney (1871–after 1955), American clubwoman, pacifist, suffragist and politician

Feminine given names